Waitt Peaks is a cluster of pointed peaks, mostly snow-covered, at the southwest end of a large horseshoe-shaped ridge. Located 4 nautical miles (7 km) northwest of Schirmacher Massif in the east part of Palmer Land. Mapped by United States Geological Survey (USGS) in 1974. Named by Advisory Committee on Antarctic Names (US-ACAN) for geologist Richard B. Waitt, a member of the USGS geological and mapping party to the Lassiter Coast, 1972–73.

Mountains of Palmer Land